Edison’s Children are a science fiction-oriented progressive rock trio, featuring Rick Armstrong (son of astronaut Neil Armstrong), Pete Trewavas (Marillion and Transatlantic) and Eric Blackwood.

They create epic concept albums with songs over an hour in length, featuring many smaller movements. Their music is a unique blend of neo-prog, drawing influences from Pink Floyd, Marillion, Porcupine Tree, Genesis and Rush.

Edison's Children are an official side-project of the rock band Marillion who began in 1979 and have sold over 15 million albums worldwide. Their first album In the Last Waking Moments... features all of the members of Marillion.

The trio play lead and rhythm guitars and synth guitars and bass, and Trewavas and Blackwood handle the lead vocals. Drumming is led by Henry Rogers of Touchstone / Mostly Autumn / DeeExpus fame and includes Lisa Wetton (wife of late Asia/King Crimson singer John Wetton) and Iluvatar's Chris Mack.

Recording engineers include Mike Hunter (producer of Marillion), Jakko Jakszyk (lead singer of King Crimson), John Mitchell (singer of Arena, Kino, Frost*, It Bites and Lonely Robot), and Robin Boult (guitarist with Fish and Pete Trewavas).

The artwork, album covers and interior photographs are by Wendy Farell-Pastore, who also does backing vocals for the band.

History
 Edison's Children have released four albums, two EPs, and one "making of" release. Every song has an accompanying piece of artwork, which appear throughout the "Lyrics and Images" booklets included with their CDs and LPs.

Between 2007 and 2013 Pete Trewavas and Eric Blackwood, with help from Rick Armstrong, wrote approximately seven albums. The less intensive musical endeavors were released first with In The Last Waking Moments… coming out in 2011. Their single from that album, "A Million Miles Away (I Wish I Had A Time Machine)", was released as a single in June 2012 and reached the FMQB Top 40 for 10 weeks, peaking on 18 October 2012 at #32 for most played song on United States commercial radio.

It features all of the members of Marillion (Steve Hogarth, Mark Kelly, Ian Mosley, Steve Rothery and Pete Trewavas; former lead singer Fish's lead guitarist also appears on it.) 

Edison's Children's albums were written and recorded around Trewavas' recording and touring sessions with Transatlantic and Marillion, during seven major sessions from March 2010 until February 2013.
 March 2011 at Saint-Sauveur, Quebec, and Montreal, Quebec, at Le Chateau in the weeks before and after the Marillion Montreal Convention of 2011.
 August 2011 at two separate beach houses in Ocean City, Maryland.
 At Black Dirt Studios in Sugar Loaf, New York, (leased from Brad Morrison who founded the band Phish), in between the Atlantic and European legs of Transatlantic's Whirlwind Tour.

Edison's Children opened for Marillion's "Brave" show at the Marillion Weekends in Port Zeilande, Netherlands; Montreal, Quebec; and Wolverhampton, England, from March to April 2013 and played a two-hour show in Montreal in addition to the evening show on the main stage. All three shows were recorded and the Montreal show has been released on the In The Last Waking Moments....

Their second album, The Final Breath Before November, was a concept album written in 2012 and released on 1 January 2014 featuring Trewavas, Blackwood and Henry Rogers on drums. It features three songs and is 79:28 long. The band also performed live with Armstrong on guitar/bass/keyboards and Lisa Wetton on drums/percussion, along with Rogers. The album had an "edge of midnight on Halloween" theme, which provided a dark canvas and a step away from their more commercial-sounding first album. The album showcased Rogers of Touchstone and DeeExpus, who at nineteen had won the Classic Rock Society's World's Best Drummer Award two years in a row, beating out Dream Theater/Transatlantic's Mike Portnoy, who had long held the honor.

On 1 August 2015, the group released their third album, Somewhere Between Here And There, featuring Chris Mack and Rogers (drums), Wendy "Darling" Farell-Pastore (backing vocals), and Armstrong (lead synth guitar).

After Somewhere Between Here and There, the band went on hiatus for several years due to Blackwood's debilitating and permanent arm and shoulder injury from his work as a special effects technician and a bout with Lyme disease, which left him in a wheelchair and tethered to an IV for over a year. He stepped away from recording and concert activity, while Armstrong finished Blackwood's work on Somewhere Between Here and There, and the band's back catalog of over 100 pieces of songs that Trewavas and Blackwood had written during the In The Last Waking Moments... and Final Breath Before November sessions.

Edison's Children released their fourth, 68-minute long album The Disturbance Fields on 20 July 2019, the fiftieth anniversary of Apollo 11 and Neil Armstrong landing on the moon. Neil Armstrong's concert celebration of the Apollo 11 moon landing (with the Alan Parsons Project) brought the band out of retirement with John Wesley and Mark Prator (both of Porcupine Tree fame) joining Armstrong, Trewavas, Blackwood and Wetton together on stage for the first time in seven years.

A double-LP 180g vinyl release of The Disturbance Fields was officially released on 23 October 2019, re-mastered by Andy VanDette, chief mastering engineer of Masterdisc; he is known for remastering Rush's back catalog along with Porcupine Tree, Metallica (One), Aerosmith (Living on the Edge), Nirvana, Paul McCartney, David Bowie, Muse, Alicia Keys and many others.

The Disturbance Fields is an ecological album about the overuse of the earth's resources leading to a battle with Mother Nature to take back the earth from human nature. Trewavas has stated:

Lineup
Current line-up:
Pete Trewavas – basses, lead and backing vocals, lead and rhythm guitars, samples and effects, drum programming, VST programming, keyboards, orchestration
Eric Blackwood – lead and backing vocals, lead and rhythm guitars, bass, keyboards, drum programming, orchestration
Rick Armstrong – synth guitar / Rickenbacker Bass / lead and rhythm guitars
Drums:
Henry Rogers – drums and percussion
Lisa Wetton – (wife of the late John Wetton, lead singer of Asia and King Crimson)

Guest members
Steve Hogarth (aka "h") – vocals – "The Awakening"
Steve Rothery – electric lead guitars – "Spiraling"
Mark Kelly – vocals – "The Awakening", keyboards – "The "Other" Other Dimension"
Ian Mosley – drums – "The Awakening"
Robin Boult – backing power rhythm guitar – "In The Last Waking Moments..."
Andy Ditchfield – vocals – "The Awakening"
Wendy Darling – backing vocals – "The Final Breath Before November" and "Where Were You (Jakko's "Whisper Ending Mix")" and all official artwork/photography
Chris Mack – drums (from Iluvatar and drummer for the NFL's Baltimore Ravens' home halftime shows)

Live band members 
Edison's Children's live band is made up of:
 Pete Trewavas – lead guitar, backing vocals, keyboards, bass
 Eric Blackwood – lead vocals, lead synth guitar
 Rick_Armstrong – rhythm guitar, keyboards, bass
 Lisa Wetton – percussion, backing vocals, drums (Wife of late Asia/King Crimson lead singer John Wetton)
 John Wesley – guitars (live guitarist of Porcupine Tree)
 Mark Prator – drums (drummer for Iced Earth/Steven Wilson)
 Anna Koropchak – violin (Apothocary)
 Dean Morekas – bass (Iluvatar)
 Chris Mack – drums (Iluvatar)
 Henry Rogers – drums (of DeeExpus and Touchstone)
 Dennis Mullin – guitar (Iluvatar)
 Mike Gusway – bass

Discography 

 2011 – In The Last Waking Moments…
 2014 – The Final Breath Before November…
 2015 – Somewhere Between Here and There
 2019 –  The Disturbance Fields

Mixdown
Mike Hunter – Mixdown of Dusk, Fracture, Fallout (Of The 2nd Kind), Outerspaced, Spiraling, The "Other" Other Dimension, Across The Plains, Lifeline, Fallout (Of The 3rd Kind), The Awakening
Robin Boult – Mixdown of "In the First Waking Moments…", "A Million Miles Away (I Wish I Had A Time Machine)","In The Last Waking Moments…", "Fallout (Of The 4th Kind)
Mike Hunter – Mastering
John Mitchell – Mastering track 5 on "Somewhere Between Here And There"
 Jakko Jakszyk (Current Lead singer of King Crimson)– Mixdown of tracks 8, 11, 14 on Somewhere Between Here And There

References

External links
Edison's Children

English progressive rock groups
English rock music groups
Musical groups established in 2011